County Route 501 (CR 501) is a county highway in New Jersey in two segments spanning Middlesex, Hudson and Bergen Counties.  The southern section runs from South Plainfield to Perth Amboy, the northern section runs from Bayonne to Rockleigh, and the two sections are connected by New York State Route 440 (NY 440) across Staten Island.

Route description

Middlesex County

County Route 501 is signed east-west in Middlesex County. The western (southern) terminus of County Route 501 is at CR 529 in South Plainfield.  From there, the route heads east to Metuchen, where it has a short concurrency with Route 27. It then continues east, crossing the Garden State Parkway between Exits 127 and 129 in Woodbridge, following concurrencies with Route 184 and Route 440 to the southern section's eastern terminus at the Outerbridge Crossing.

Hudson County (John F. Kennedy Boulevard)
The northern section of CR 501 begins in Hudson County, New Jersey and is known as Kennedy Boulevard. It starts at the Route 440/Bayonne Bridge junction in Bayonne, making its way north to Route 63 in North Bergen. The highway crosses Route 139 to the Holland Tunnel and Route 495 to the Lincoln Tunnel.

At its junction with Route 63 in North Bergen, CR 501 begins a concurrency with Route 63 into Bergen County, while Kennedy Boulevard loops around the northern end of the county and heads south through Guttenberg, West New York and Weehawken, where it is known as Boulevard East.

Major points on CR 501/Kennedy Boulevard include Marist High School,  New Jersey City University, Saint Dominic Academy, Saint Peter's University, Journal Square, Union City High School, North Bergen High School, and four Hudson County parks: Stephen R. Gregg (Bayonne) Park and Mercer Park in Bayonne, Lincoln Park in Jersey City and James J. Braddock (North Hudson) Park in North Bergen.

Immediately northeast of Journal Square, CR 501/Kennedy Boulevard crosses over Port Authority Trans-Hudson (PATH) railroad tracks on an open-spandrel concrete arch bridge completed in 1926. The bridge is a pared-down version of a more ambitious elevated plaza scheme proposed by consulting engineer Abraham Burton Cohen. Cohen's office constructed a model using slot cars to demonstrate traffic flow through the plaza.

The boulevard continues north through Jersey City Heights, passing Dr. Leonard J. Gordon Park. In the area once known as Transfer Station, it enters North Hudson.

Bergen County
In Bergen County, CR 501 leaves its concurrency with Route 63 in Palisades Park, using Central Boulevard to connect to the US 1/9/46 concurrency and Route 93.  It is then concurrent with Route 93 until it reaches that route's northern terminus at Route 4 in Englewood. CR 501 continues north from this junction through Rockleigh, crossing the New York State Line and becoming New York State Route 340.

History
In 1808, the Perth Amboy Turnpike was legislated to run from Perth Amboy to Bound Brook. The company struggled to complete their road, having petitioned in 1820 to the state legislature to extend the time to complete the road. They were unsuccessful, as the road was only completed as far as Piscataway. 

Prior to being renamed in honor of John F. Kennedy in the 1960s, the John F. Kennedy Boulevard was known as Hudson Boulevard. While there was discussion of building a county long road as early as the 1870s, parts of Hudson County Boulevard were officially opened in 1896. By 1913 it was completed, and considered to be fine for "motoring", and included the road's eastern section, Boulevard East, into which Kennedy Boulevard forks at 91st Street. (The fork that continues north merges with Bergen Boulevard.) Taken as a single road, the circuitous route of west and east sections of the entire boulevard runs from the southern tip of the county at Bergen Point to its northern border with Bergen County and south again to the Hoboken city line. 

The Boulevard was named the fifth most dangerous road for pedestrians in New Jersey, and the most dangerous road in Hudson County for pedestrians in a February 2011 report by the non-profit Tri-State Transportation Campaign. The road was the location of six pedestrian fatalities between 2007 and 2009, which account for a little more than a fifth of Hudson County's 29 pedestrian deaths in the three-year period. In November 2017 county officials launched a safety campaign for Kennedy Boulevard's five most dangerous intersections, based on accident data:
25th Street in Bayonne
Lexington Avenue in Jersey City
36th Street in Union City
51st Street in West New York
91st Street in North Bergen

County officials had expressed interest in building a pedestrian bridge that crosses Kennedy Boulevard at 32nd Street, at the Union City-North Bergen border since at least. The two cities contracted a company to build the bridge for just over $4 million in November 2010. Construction plans began in May 2011, and field work began later that August.

Major intersections

See also

References

External links

An enlarged view of road jurisdiction at the Fort Lee approaches to the George Washington Bridge
New Jersey Roads: County Route 501 and NJ 63, NJ 93
NJ State Highways: CR 200-514

501
501
501
501
New Jersey County Route 501
Monuments and memorials to John F. Kennedy in the United States